The zero-width joiner (ZWJ) is a non-printing character used in the computerized typesetting of writing systems in which the shape or positioning of a grapheme depends on its relation to other graphemes (complex scripts), such as the Arabic script or any Indic script. Sometimes the Roman script is to be counted as complex, e.g. when using a Fraktur typeface.  When placed between two characters that would otherwise not be connected, a ZWJ causes them to be printed in their connected forms.

The exact behaviour of the ZWJ varies depending on whether the use of a conjunct consonant or ligature (where multiple characters are shown with a single glyph) is expected by default; for instance, it suppresses the use of conjuncts in Devanagari (whilst still allowing the use of the individual joining form of a dead consonant, as opposed to a halant form as would be required by the zero-width non-joiner), but induces the use of conjuncts in Sinhala (which does not use them by default). Similarly to Sinhala, when a ZWJ is placed between two emoji characters (or interspersed between multiple), it can result in a single glyph being shown, such as the family emoji, made up of two adult emoji and one or two child emoji.

In some cases, such as the second Devanagari example below, the ZWJ can be used to display a joining form in isolation, when included after the character and combining halant code.

In the InScript keyboard layout for Indian languages, it is typed by the key combination Ctrl+Shift+1. However, many layouts use the position of QWERTY's ']' key for this character.

Examples

See also
 Word joiner
 Zero-width non-joiner

References

External links
 Proposal on Clarification and Consolidation of the Function of ZERO WIDTH JOINER in Indic Scripts

Control characters
Typography
Unicode formatting code points